A Holocaust memorial day or Holocaust remembrance day is an annual observance to commemorate the victims of the Holocaust, the genocide of six million Jews and of millions of other Holocaust victims by Nazi Germany and its collaborators. Many countries, primarily in Europe, have designated national dates of commemoration. In 2005, the United Nations instituted an international observance, International Holocaust Remembrance Day.

Many observances fall on 27 January, the anniversary of the liberation of Auschwitz concentration camp in 1945, while other countries selected separate dates, often to mark anniversaries of national events during the Holocaust. Holocaust remembrance days often include efforts to combat hatred and antisemitism.

List of observances

, twelve countries observed January 27, the day of the liberation of the Auschwitz concentration camp, including Germany, Britain, Italy and Scandinavian countries. In 2003 France designated this date as the day of remembrance of genocides and prevention of crimes against humanity. In 2004 Israel designated this date as a mark of the struggle against antisemitism.

, eleven countries in Europe had chosen dates related to local histories.

Commemorations and memorials
 In January 2020, a ceremony was held at Auschwitz to mark the 75th anniversary of its liberation on January 27, 1945. this included speeches by numerous officials and Jewish communal leaders. Large number of Holocaust survivors attended this ceremony. In the United Kingdom, government officials, religious leaders and community leaders gathered in London to commemorate this anniversary. On the same date, German police reported they were investigating the sales of a brand of beer with Nazi-style symbols on its labeling.
 In 2021 a number of Jewish organizations in the United Kingdom incorporated the situation in Xinjiang into their Holocaust Memorial Day remembrances and commemorations.

See also
 United Nations Holocaust Memorial
 List of Holocaust memorials and museums
 Roma Holocaust Memorial Day

References

Further reading

Holocaust Memorial Days: An overview of remembrance and education in the OSCE region, 27 January 2015
Holocaust Memorial Days: An overview of remembrance and education in the OSCE region, 2018

January observances
March observances
April observances
July observances
May observances